This battle was fought on 10 July 1651, with some minor fighting on 8 July, south of Naxos in the Greek Islands, between Venetian and Turkish sailing ship/galley forces. It was a Venetian victory.

Background 
The Venetian fleet, under Alvise Mocenigo, sailed from Cerigo to Euboea at the end of June 1651. It consisted of twenty eight sailing ships (under Luca Francesco Barbarigo, with Dolfin and Girolamo Battaglia), six galleasses (Francesco Morosini) and twenty four galleys (Mocenigo, with Molin). There on 2 July he learned that the Turkish fleet under kapudan pasha Hosambegzade ALi Pasha had left Chios for Patmos on 29 June, and sailed south to Santorin, hoping to intercept it before it reached Crete. He arrived on 5 July, and on 7 July the Turkish fleet appeared from the east, sailing to the south of Santorini, but it turned north when it spotted some Venetian stragglers, and Mocenigo tried to support them. Nineteen sailing ships under Battaglia formed a line abreast, but darkness prevented any action from happening that day.

The battle 
On 8 July, the Venetians were somewhat scattered, with five sailing ships, under Battaglia, close to the Turks. He was unsupported against them until Barbarigo with six sailing ships engaged the Turkish rowing vessels. The Turks retired north, towing some of their sailing ships, toward the channel between Naxos and Paros.

On 9 July, the Venetians were more scattered, with only one sailing ship supporting their galleys, and Mocenigo had to join them with the rest. The Turks were to the north, steering between Paros and Naxos.

On 10 July, two galleasses, under Tomaso and Lazaro Mocenigo, broke formation and attacked some Turkish galleys which were still watering at Paros. They ended up fighting the Kapudan Pasha himself, with six galleasses and some galleys, and Tomaso was killed. Francesco Morosini arrived with the Venetian galleys, and later the Venetian Right and Center joined and the Turkish galleys fled, leaving their sailing ships unsupported. These fled north or east of Naxos, but they were overhauled by the Venetian rowing vessels, which captured, forced them ashore or burnt them. The Turks lost ten or eleven sailing ships and one galleass captured, and five (sailing ships?) burnt, as well as 965 prisoners. Afterward, Mocenigo sailed to Heraklion, and the Turks to Rhodes.

Ships involved 
Many of the Venetian ships were hired Dutch or English.

Venice (Alvise Mocenigo)
Leoncorno Bianco
Giovanni Battista
Aquila Negra
Giovanni Battista
Arma di Venezia
Profeta Daniel
San Giobbe
San Zorzi (Giorgio)
Maria Elizabeta
Principe piccolo
Margarita
San Pietro
San Zorzi
Madonna della Vigna
Aquila d'Oro
Dragon
Sacrificio d'Abram
Difesa
Rotta Fortuna
Croce d'Oro
Damian
Tomaso Francesco
Fregata Grimani
San Marco grande
San Marco piccolo
Beneditione
Profeta Samuel
6 galleasses
24 galleys

Ottomans
55 sailing ships – 10 or 11 captured
6 galleasses – 1 captured
53 galleys

References
 
 

1651
Conflicts in 1651
1650s in the Ottoman Empire
History of Naxos
17th century in Greece
1651 in Europe